Cystiscus caeruleus is a species of very small sea snail, a marine gastropod mollusk or micromollusk in the family Cystiscidae.

Description
The shell is a smooth, semi-translucent white with a slit-like opening along one side.

Distribution
This marine species occurs off New Caledonia.

References

Cystiscidae
Gastropods described in 2003
Caeruleus